Cristina González Ramos (born 6 August 1983) is a retired Spanish handball goalkeeper. She played on the Spanish women's national team.

She was part of the  Spanish team at the 2008 European Women's Handball Championship, where the Spanish team reached the final, after defeating Germany in the semifinal.
She competed at the 2011 World Women's Handball Championship in Brazil, where the Spanish team placed third.

References

1983 births
Living people
Sportspeople from Salamanca
Spanish female handball players
Competitors at the 2013 Mediterranean Games
Mediterranean Games competitors for Spain
21st-century Spanish women